Monster Maze is a first-person maze game written by Robert Schilling and published in 1982 by Epyx for the Atari 8-bit family and VIC-20.

Gameplay

Monster Maze is a game in which the player collects gold bars in a maze while being chased by monsters. The object is to collect as many gold bars as possible before losing all nine lives, while avoiding monsters that run around the maze. After clearing a maze, the player advances to a new, more difficult level. There are a 48 monsters scattered across the 16 levels and 48 vitamin pills that player can eat. When vitamin-charged, the player can chase a monster for a few steps and kill it.

Reception
Allen Doum reviewed the game for Computer Gaming World, and stated that "The speed of play is slow, even at the higher difficulty settings, and the monsters move more quickly while the player is moving than they do while he is standing still."

Reviews
Electronic Fun with Computers & Games - Apr, 1983

References

External links
1984 Software Encyclopedia from Electronic Games
Book of Atari Software 1983

1982 video games
Atari 8-bit family games
Epyx games
Maze games
VIC-20 games
Video games developed in the United States